Anthony Revolori ( Quiñonez; born April 28, 1996) is an American actor. He is best known for his role as Zero Moustafa in The Grand Budapest Hotel (2014), for which he was nominated for numerous acting awards, and Flash Thompson in the Marvel Cinematic Universe films Spider-Man: Homecoming (2017), Spider-Man: Far From Home (2019) and Spider-Man: No Way Home (2021).

Early life
Revolori was born and raised in Anaheim, California. His parents, Sonia and Mario Quiñonez, are from Jutiapa, Guatemala. His father was an actor during his earlier years in Guatemala. Revolori's brother, Mario Quiñonez (also known as Mario Revolori), is also an actor. Born Anthony Quiñonez, he adopted "Revolori", the surname of his paternal grandmother. Revolori has a younger brother, Benjamin Revolori, who portrayed a younger version of his character, Prince Graydon, in the Disney+ series Willow.

Career
Revolori began his career as a child actor, getting his first role at age two, in a baby food commercial. His first major role was as the young Zero Moustafa in Wes Anderson's comedy The Grand Budapest Hotel. In 2014, he was named one of the best actors under the age of twenty by IndieWire. 

Revolori played Flash Thompson in the 2017 Marvel Cinematic Universe superhero film Spider-Man: Homecoming and its 2019 sequel. Because of his casting, and the fact that the character was re-imagined as not a stereotypical jock bully, Revolori received hate mail and death threats from certain fans of the comics. In 2021, Revolori returned in the third film Spider-Man: No Way Home.  He also had a lead role in Hannah Fidell's comedy The Long Dumb Road, opposite Jason Mantzoukas.

On June 17, 2022, Revolori appeared on a self-titled skit off of rapper Logic's seventh studio album Vinyl Days, in which he is calling to confirm a movie night with the artist.

In July 2022, Nickelodeon announced that Revolori would voice the character Deuce Gorgon in the 2022 animated reboot series Monster High. In 2023, he co-starred in the horror film Scream VI.

Awards 
In 2018, Revolori was awarded an Impact Award by the National Hispanic Media Coalition for his “Outstanding Performance in a Motion Picture”.

Theatre

Filmography

Films

Television

Web series

References

External links

 

1996 births
21st-century American male actors
American male child actors
American male film actors
American male television actors
American male voice actors
American people of Guatemalan descent
Hispanic and Latino American male actors
Living people
Male actors from Anaheim, California